Yaroslav Vasylyovych Dubnevych ( born 7 August 1969) is a Ukrainian politician. He serves as People's Deputy of the Verkhovna Rada of the VIII class. He was a member of the Poroshenko Bloc faction, and former chairman of the Committee on Transport.

He is the People's Deputy of the IX convocation, and member of the deputy group "For the Future". He was the chairman of the Subcommittee on Medical Technology and Medical Transport of the Verkhovna Rada Committee on Nation Health, Medical Care and Health Insurance.

Career 
In the early elections to the Verkhovna Rada, which took place on October 26, 2014, Yaroslav Dubnevych won in the single-mandate constituency № 120 (Lviv region), gaining 60.1% of the vote. He was a member of the Petro Poroshenko Bloc parliamentary faction. On December 4, 2014, he headed the Verkhovna Rada Committee on Transport.

He was a Member of the Inter-Parliamentary Relations Group with Hungary, Member of the Inter-Parliamentary Relations Group with Kuwait, Member of the Inter-Parliamentary Relations Group with Jordan, Member of the Inter-Parliamentary Relations Group with Indonesia.

He was one of the initiators of the State Road Fund, the purpose of which was to create a mechanism for the distribution of financial revenues to repair roads. The relevant bill was passed by parliament in November 2016.

Criticism and criminal proceedings 
The media repeatedly reported that commercial entities associated with Yaroslav Dubnevych and his brother Bohdan regularly win tenders for the supply of spare parts for Ukrzaliznytsia. In 2016 alone, the state-owned company purchased goods worth about UAH 1 billion from them. The Minister of Infrastructure Volodymyr Omelyan expressed doubts about their necessity.

References 

1969 births
Living people
People from Lviv Oblast
Ninth convocation members of the Verkhovna Rada